Polus may refer to:

People 
Polus, a figure in Greek philosophy
Polus of Aegina, an ancient Greek actor
Aleksander Polus, a Polish boxer
Kazimierz Polus, a Polish serial killer
Tomas Polus, a Swedish politician
Coeus, an ancient Greek Titan; called Polus in Roman mythology

Other uses 
SS Messina, a German steamship renamed Polus when transferred to the Soviet Union
Polyus (spacecraft), a weapons spacecraft also referred to as Polus
Polus, a map in the video game Among Us

See also 
Polis (disambiguation)